My Breakfast with Blassie is a 1983 film starring Andy Kaufman and professional wrestler "Classy" Freddie Blassie.

It is a mostly improvised parody of the art film My Dinner with Andre and is set in a Sambo's restaurant where Kaufman and Blassie have a discussion over breakfast. Lynne Margulies, who would later become Kaufman's girlfriend, plays a role; in fact, she and Kaufman met for the first time on camera. Also featured is Bob Zmuda, who plays a nosy fan.

My Breakfast with Blassie was conceived of by Linda Lautrec and Johnny Legend as a satire on My Dinner with Andre. Linda Lautrec and Andy Kaufman loosely scripted the film over several months late at night on the telephone. Linda's dual role (as director and actress) was scripted as an irritating fan who requests Andy's autograph after he washes his hands.

References

External links

1983 comedy films
1983 films
Professional wrestling films
Media containing Gymnopedies
American parody films
Andy Kaufman
1980s English-language films
1980s American films